Pioneer Village is a subway station on the Line 1 Yonge–University of the Toronto subway. It is located under the intersection of Northwest Gate and Steeles Avenue, at the city boundaries of Toronto and Vaughan, Ontario, Canada. A Toronto Transit Commission (TTC) bus terminal is connected to the southern portion of the station, and there is a regional bus terminal, the Pioneer Village Terminal, for connecting to York Region Transit (YRT) buses on the north side of Steeles Avenue. Pioneer Village, Highway 407 and Vaughan Metropolitan Centre stations are the first Toronto subway stations fully or partially located outside the Toronto city limits since its last amalgamation in 1998.

Station name
The station was initially expected to be named Steeles West. This followed the usual convention of TTC stations being named after cross streets, with West appended to station names on the northern section of the western branch of the line having counterparts along the eastern branch. In this case, there was no "Steeles" station counterpart on the eastern branch, and instead the unbuilt station was named Black Creek Pioneer Village on September 28, 2012, after the nearby heritage museum. On July 24, 2013, the name was shortened to Pioneer Village.

Description

The station lies on a northwest–southeast axis, with the line approaching the station from York University station northwestward, directly under the university's main buildings. The northern portion of the station lies in the City of Vaughan (York Region) and the southern portion in the City of Toronto. There are three station entrances, two being structures that are situated on both the north and south sides of Steeles Avenue. One of two south entrances (in Toronto) connects to the fare-paid TTC bus terminal. with 12 bays. The other is incorporated into the bus terminal itself and is accessed via a signalized crosswalk across the bus driveways from the university's sports facilities. The third—the north entrance in Vaughan—is adjacent to the York Region Transit bus terminal as well as an on-street passenger pick-up and drop-off area. A large commuter lot with a 1,881-vehicle capacity is situated in the hydro corridor to the north of the York Region Transit (YRT) terminal. Unusually, both street entrances lead to separate mezzanine levels, despite both serving as primary points of access (although many stations have secondary automatic entrances), and it is necessary for non-subway riders transferring between TTC and YRT buses to go down to and walk the length of the platform to connect between the two bus terminals.

The station has three levels: the entrances at street level, the two mezzanines just below them, and the train platform at the bottom. Enough space has been left between the surface and the platform to allow for the construction of an underground station for a future light rail transit line.

The station was designed by a consortium of architects and engineers, Spadina Group Associates – including All Design (headed by British architect Will Alsop) and IBI Group. Landscape design of the station was by Janet Rosenberg & Studio. The station features entrance structures on the southeast and northwest sides at a street intersection. The layout makes the entrances mirror each other, giving an overall symmetrical effect. The southwest corner of the intersection also includes an oculus for a light cone above the platform. Both entrance structures have cool roofs and green roofs. To the south of the station, there is a crossover to short turn trains.

Artwork

Artists Tim Edler and Jan Edler of Berlin-based Realities-United provided interactive artwork, titled LightSpell, consisting of a row of 40 light fixtures suspended from the ceiling over the platform. These units can display text as well as illuminate the platform. The intent of the artists was that waiting passengers would key in text (maximum of 8 characters) using several touch screens for display on the lighting units. Other waiting passengers could change the text. However, when the Toronto–York Spadina Subway Extension (TYSSE) opened, the TTC decided not to activate this feature, despite previously agreeing to do so as shown by the installation of the commissioned piece, because of the potential for displaying offensive messages. Given that the 2009 revision of the TTC By-law No. 1 explicitly prohibits the use of such language, a question remains of how that by-law would apply to an artwork as it is not itself communicating "profane, insulting or obscene language or gestures". The TTC is negotiating a compromise solution with the artists, raising questions of how a compromise of this nature undermines the fundamentals of the artwork. The cost of the artwork was $500,000.

History
On November 27, 2009, the official ground-breaking ceremony was held for the Toronto–York Spadina Subway Extension (TYSSE) project, which included the construction of Pioneer Village station. Tunnelling began in June 2011. The project was expected to be completed by December 2015, later revised to the fourth quarter of 2016. The extension and station ultimately opened on December 17, 2017.

Pioneer Village was originally planned to be a temporary terminus for the western arm of Line 1 Yonge–University, which would later be extended to Vaughan Metropolitan Centre. However, the entire extension, with its six new stations, was completed as one project.

This station, along with the five other TYSSE stations, were the first to be opened without collectors, although booths were installed as per original station plans. It was also among the first eight stations to discontinue sales of legacy TTC fare media (tokens and tickets). Presto vending machines were available at its opening to sell Presto cards and to load funds or monthly passes onto them. On May 3, 2019, this station became one of the first ten stations to sell Presto tickets via Presto vending machines.

Nearby landmarks
The major buildings of York University's main Keele Campus lie to the southeast. Canlan Ice Sports (home of York Lions hockey and the Toronto Six) and Sobeys Stadium (home of the Rogers Cup) are found to the southwest, the Toronto Track and Field Centre is to the east and York Lions Stadium (home of York United FC) is to the immediate south.

Surface connections

The following routes serve this station.

Pioneer Village Terminal

A York Region Transit bus terminal is located outside the station's fare-paid area on the north side of Steeles Avenue on the west side of Northwest Gate. It lies adjacent to the commuter parking lot and has an outdoor walkway linking it with the station. An additional fare is required when transferring between YRT services at this terminal and the TTC.

The following YRT routes serve the terminal:

References

External links

 Published by CBC News on December 28, 2017
Lightspell at realities:united

Line 1 Yonge–University stations
Railway stations in Canada opened in 2017
York Region Transit Terminals
Railway stations in Vaughan
2017 establishments in Ontario